Sukirti Kandpal (born 20 November 1990) is an Indian actress and model who appears in Hindi television. She marked her acting debut with Sab TV's youth show  Jersey No 10 in 2007. Kandpal got recognition after portraying the leading roles of Dr. Riddhima Gupta in Dill Mill Gayye (2008–2009) and Piya Dobriyal in romantic thriller Pyaar Kii Ye Ek Kahaani (2010-11). She also participated in Colors TV's reality show Bigg Boss 8 in 2014. 

Her other notable works include portraying Simran Khanna in Kaisa Yeh Ishq Hai... Ajab Sa Risk Hai (2013-14) and Debjani Thakur in Dilli Wali Thakur Gurls (2015). She was last seen portraying business woman Alia Shroff in Story 9 Months Ki (2020–2021).

Life and education 
Kandpal was born in Nainital, Uttarakhand, to B.D. Kandpal (former President of the Uttarakhand Bar Association, Deputy Advocate General of Uttarakhand High Court) and Manju Kandpal. She has two siblings an elder sister, Bhavna Kandpal, and a younger brother, Manjul Kandpal. She attended St. Mary's Convent High School, Nainital. 

Kandpal originally wanted to pursue law as her father was a public prosecutor. She received an honors degree in Economics from Sophia College for Women, Mumbai. She dated Manavendra Singh Shekhawat during the early years of her career but split afterwards.

Career

2007–2009: Start of a career and Dill Mill Gayye 
Kandpal started her television career in 2007 with Jersey No. 10 on Sab TV, an Indian adaptation of the American series One Tree Hill. A creative director from Cinevistaas Limited spotted her at a coffee shop and asked her to meet him later for an audition. In the same year, she also appeared in the various episodics of Indian horror thriller  television anthology series Ssshhhh...Phir Koi Hai on Star One.

In 2008, she replaced Shilpa Anand as Dr. Riddhima Gupta in medical romantic comedy show Dill Mill Gayye. She worked there for ten months and quit in 2009.

In 2009, she appeared in the official music video of the song "Teri Yaad Mein" from the album Chaandan Mein by Kailash Kher.

2010–2015: Breakthrough in Pyaar Kii Ye Ek Kahaani and Bigg Boss 

In 2010, she appeared as Siddheshwari Singh in Agle Janam Mohe Bitiya Hi Kijo. In June 2010, she participated in Imagine TV's reality show Meethi Choori No 1. Later in October 2010, she played a double role in Balaji Telefilms' supernatural romance Pyaar Kii Ye Ek Kahaani as Piya Dobriyal and as Princess Maithili. The show was first youth centric supernatural series in India inspired by The Vampire Diaries and Twilight Saga. The show aired its last episode on 15 December 2011 and established her fame and recognition. In the same year, she participated in another reality show for Imagine TV, Nachle Ve with Saroj Khan.

Kandpal took a break before returning to acting in 2012 as NRI Jazz in Rab Se Sona Ishq in 2012. She appeared as four characters with same face in Life OK's series Mystery of clones as a part of Hum Ne Li Hai...Shapath and later returned for another episode as a part of team of criminals who escape from prison to take revenge on Shapath team. She co-hosted a special episode based on the harassment of girls in the crime based television series Gumrah: End of Innocence on Channel V, and later made an appearance on the same show as a college girl in an episode based on the consequences of an open relationship.

In 2013, she starred in Kaisa Ye Ishq Hai..ajab sa risk hai on Life OK as lead. In 2014, she participated in the reality show Bigg Boss 8 where she survived for two weeks until she got evicted on day 14.

In 2015, she played a journalist, Debjani Thakur, in &TV's Dilli Wali Thakur Gurls, which was a TV adaptation of Anuja Chauhan's novel Those Pricey Thakur Gurls.

2016–present: Kaala Teeka and further success with Story 9 Months Ki
In early 2016, Kandpal appeared as a lead in the episode "Grahan" of &TV's horror fiction show Darr Sabko Lagta Hai. She next played the character of a Haryanvi girl Rajjo in Zee TV's Tashan-E-Ishq.

She was a celebrity host for the travel-centered web series Desi Explorers also featuring in two sub series of Desi Explorers: Desi Explorers Jordan and Desi Explorers Taiwan. In 2017, she returned to fictional TV series in season 2 of Zee TV's Kaala Teeka as Naina Yug Choudhary. After this, she decided to have some time off to spend with her family. In July 2019, after a hiatus of two years, she appeared as Saundarya in a five part special crime thriller titled "Chausar" as a part of Savdhaan India special crime series on Star Bharat.

In November 2020, she made a comeback as a lead character of a successful businesswoman Alia Shroff in Story 9 Months Ki on Sony TV. Story 9 Months Ki is first-ever show based on choice motherhood through In vitro fertilization on Indian television and explores the journey of a successful single woman towards motherhood on her own terms. Show was termed as one of the most pathbreaking shows of the year 2021 by Urban Asian. Her character Alia Shroff was included among a list of Strong female characters on Indian television and web series by The Times of India.

Modelling
Kandpal has appeared in advertisements and TVCs for PC Chandra Jewellers Goldlite collection, Hyundai 4S Fluidic Verna The World Sedan, Dove shampoo, Shahnaz Husain's Fair One Cream, and Margo Neem Face wash.

Other work 
In 2016, she was associated with the "Sarvodaya Women Empowerment" initiative by Nainital police in her home state of Uttarakhand. In 2020, she was associated with "Main Darpok Hoon", an awareness campaign by Hamdard India which was aimed at encouraging people to stay indoors and take preventive measures to stay healthy and safe during the COVID-19 pandemic. In 2021, she received MEGA Achievers Award by Make Earth Green Again (MEGA) foundation for her work for animal welfare.

In the media
In a Hindustan Times poll on The Next Big Thing: Television actors (2011), she was chosen by senior actor Varun Badola as the one who "has the potential to make it big" alongside Ragini Khanna and Ankita Lokhande. She was included in Eastern Eyes list of the top 50 sexiest Asian women in 2014, 2015, 2016 and 2017. An Indian lifestyle website for men, MensXP.com, listed her among the "35 Hottest Actresses In Indian Television" and also included her among the most desired actresses of Indian Television among teens from 2000s. In 2016, MissMalini.com listed her among the "28 Sexiest Hindi Television Actresses".

She was ranked 20th Television Personality in a 2015 poll by Sabras Radio for her show Dilli Wali Thakur Gurls. She has been a regular face of the annual Telly Calendar, featuring popular Indian television actresses by Marinating Films and Balaji Telefilms, and was part of all six of its editions up to 2017. She received the Aadhi Aabadi Women Achievers Award in 2013 for outstanding contributions in her field. She was featured in the list of 2021's Top 50 Women of Indian Television by a South Asian entertainment website Urban Asian for her performance in Story 9 Months Ki.

Beauty pageants 
Kandpal represented India (as Miss India Worldwide India) in the 2011 Miss India Worldwide contest held in Dubai, won the title Miss Bollywood Diva, and was one of the top ten contenders among the participants spanning over 30 countries. She was a judge for the Mrs. India Dubai International Beauty Pageant in 2016, alongside Dia Mirza and Mr and Miss Delhi India in 2017, alongside Aditi Govitrikar and Shahnaz Hussain.

Filmography

Television

Reality and guest appearances

Other appearances

Music videos

Short Film

Awards and nominations

Other awards

References

External links

 
 

Living people
Actresses from Uttarakhand
Soap opera
Actresses in Hindi television
People from Nainital
Sophia College for Women alumni
Bigg Boss (Hindi TV series) contestants
1988 births